Institute Of Engineering & Science IPS Academy Indore is an Autonomous engineering education institution under UGC guidelines, located at Indore city beside NH-3 in Madhya pradesh state, India. It was established in Indore on 19 October 1999 after securing approval of the All India Council for Technical Education, New Delhi, and Government of Madhya Pradesh to commence in the 1999–2000 academic year. It ranks among the top 45 private engineering institutions in India.

It offers a 4-year undergraduate program in Fire Tech and Safety Engineering. The academy is affiliated to Rajiv Gandhi Proudyogiki Vishwavidyalaya Bhopal, the Technical University of Madhya Pradesh and is approved by the All India Council for Technical Education (AICTE) New Delhi, Government of Madhya Pradesh, and Directorate Of Technical Education Bhopal.

History
Institute Of Engineering & Science IPS Academy is one of the sixteen colleges of the IPS Academy, which is a successor to Indore Public School. The Government of Madhya Pradesh accorded permission to open a self-supporting and self-financing engineering Institute, and thus, in October 1999, the Institute Of Engineering & Science IPS Academy Indore came into existence.

Reputation 

The Times Engineering magazine ranked the Institute 38th out of private institutions in its 2014 survey of engineering colleges in India. Careers360 gave the Institute a AAA+ rating and ranked it 8th in its 2015 survey of engineering colleges in Madhya Pradesh.

First private Institute that is grant Autonomous status by University Grant Commission (UGC).The Institute UG courses is accredited by the National Board of Accreditation (NBA), New Delhi. All courses are approved by the All India Council for Technical Education, New Delhi and recognized by the Directorate of Technical Education, Madhya Pradesh.

The Institute is also accredited by Tata Consultancy Services, India's oldest and largest software company. The Institute was the first in India to introduce an undergraduate degree in fire technology & safety engineering.

Academics

The college offers various undergraduate (8 semesters) and postgraduate courses.

Undergraduate courses

The B.E. degree is four years (eight semesters) long and is offered in the following fields:
1.Mechanical Engineering
2.Electronics and Communication Engineering
3.Electrical & Electronics Engineering
4.Civil Engineering
5.Computer Science and Engineering
6.Chemical Engineering
7.Fire Technology & Safety Engineering
8.Computer Science and Information Technology
9 Computer Science and Engineering(IoT)
10Computer Science and Engineering (Data Science)

Postgraduate courses
The IPS Academy M.E. and M.Tech. programs are two years long. These degrees are offered following fields:
 
1.Structural Engineering
2.Industrial Safety Engineering
3.Chemical Engineering
4.Electronics & Communications Engineering
5.Power Electronics
6.Construction Planning and Management
7.Computer Science & Engineering
8.Robotics

Admission 
 Until 2013, admission to the Institute at undergraduate level was based on performance in the MP-PET. Currently, the Institute offers admission on the basis of student performance in the Joint Entrance Examination.
 At postgraduate level, admission is on the basis of the Graduate Aptitude Test in Engineering (GATE).
 Admission to the Master of Computer Applications course is on the basis of the MP-MCA examination.
 IES IPS Academy follows the reservation policy declared by the  Supreme Court of India, by which 27% of positions are reserved for Other Backward Classes (OBCs), 15% for Scheduled Castes (SCs), and 7.5% for Scheduled Tribes (STs)

Departments 

The Institute Of Engineering & Science IPS Academy has 11 departments. The academic departments are:
Department of Mechanical Engineering
 Department of Computer Science & Engineering
 Department of Electronics & Telecommunication
 Department of Electrical & Electronics Engineering
 Applied Mathematics Department
 Department of Training Placements & Humanities
 Civil Engineering Department
 Chemical Engineering  Department
 Department of Fire Tech. & Safety Engineering
 Department of General Engineering
 Department of Robotics

References

External links

 

Engineering colleges in Madhya Pradesh
Universities and colleges in Indore
Science and technology in Indore
1999 establishments in Madhya Pradesh
Educational institutions established in 1999